La Masquerade Infernale (Misspelled French for The Infernal Masquerade. The correct spelling would be La Mascarade Infernale.) is the second studio album by Arcturus. Released by Misanthropy Records in 1997, the album marks a drastic musical change from the slow, nature-influenced melodic black metal of Aspera Hiems Symfonia. Most of the songs revolve around the themes of theater, literature, and Satan. The screams characteristic of black metal utilized by Kristoffer Rygg on Aspera are replaced by a gruff, low-toned, clean vocal style. The album also features operatic singing and bizarre high-pitched singing from guest vocalist Simen Hestnæs, who nine years later would replace Rygg as the band's frontman. It was reissued by Candlelight Records in 2003.

In 2021, it was elected by Metal Hammer as the 12th best symphonic metal album of all time.

Track listing

 The album is actually 1:27 longer than listed due to the hidden track at the beginning of "Master of Disguise".
 The lyrics of "Alone" are taken from a poem by Edgar Allan Poe.
 "The Throne of Tragedy" is divided into 66 parts. At the end of the track, the sub-track counter will have increased to 66, making the display show the number 666.

Personnel 

Arcturus
 Kristoffer Rygg (credited as "Garm") - vocals, samples, electronics, production, mastering
 Knut Magne Valle - electric guitar, production
 Hugh Mingay (credited as "Skoll") - bass guitar
 Steinar Sverd Johnsen (credited as "Sverd") - keyboards
 Jan Axel Blomberg (credited as "Hellhammer") - drums, percussion

Additional Musicians
 Hans Josef Groh - cello
 Dorthe Dreier - viola
 Vegard Johnsen - violin
 Svein Haugen - double bass
 Simen Hestnæs - vocals on "The Chaos Path", backing vocals on "Master Of Disguise" and "Painting My Horror"
 Carl August Tidemann - lead guitar on "Ad Astra" and "Of Nails And Sinners"
 Idun Felberg - cornet on "Ad Astra"
 Erik Olivier Lancelot - flute on "Ad Astra"

Other Credits
 Børge Finstad - mixing
 Pål Klåstad - technician, engineering (strings)
 Marius Bodin - engineering (drums)
 Gandalf Stryke - mastering

References

Arcturus (band) albums
1997 albums